Petit Omar or Little Omar was the nickname of Yacef Omar (1944–1957), a notable figure of the Algerian War for Independence.

Biography 
Yacef Omar was born in January 1944 at the Casbah of Algiers in a kabyle family. He is the nephew of Yacef Saadi, leader of the Autonomous Zone of Algiers. Little Omar was the liaison officer between the fighters and the leaders of the FLN (National Liberation Front) during the “Battle of Algiers”.

Omar grew in the big familial house with Yacef Saadi. This allowed him to see the figureheads of the Algerian Revolution like Abane Ramdane, Krim Belkacem, Colonel Ouamrane, Rabah Bitat, and Ali La Pointe who visited his uncle regularly. Courier between the militants and the FLN leaders, he succeeded to cross all police roadblocks and elude the French paratroopers in the hardest moments of the Battle of Algiers.

On October 8, 1957 paratrooper commandos of the 1st Foreign Parachute Regiment destroyed the house where he was hiding following their refusal to surrender, killing him along with Hassiba Ben Bouali, Ali La Pointe, Hamid Bouhamidi and 16 others.

Tribute 
A new ultramodern hospital located at Draa Ben Khedda was named “Yacef Omar Hospital” in tribute to the child of the Casbah. His uncle Yacef Saadi was present the day of the inauguration on February 18, 2014.

In popular culture
Omar is played by Mohamed Ben Kassen in the 1966 Italian-Algerian movie The Battle of Algiers.

References 

 Jean-Louis Gérard, Dictionnaire historique et biographique de la guerre d'Algérie, Éditions Jean Curtuchet, 2001 

1944 births
Algerian Muslims
1957 deaths
Algerian guerrillas killed in action
Deaths by explosive device
Members of the National Liberation Front (Algeria)